Xylorycta flavicosta is a moth in the family Xyloryctidae. It was described by Thomas Pennington Lucas in 1894. It is found in Australia, where it has been recorded from Queensland.

The wingspan is 28–38 mm. The forewings are rich slaty grey, becoming ashy grey toward the basal portion of the costa. There is an orange-red costal band, more brown red in females and with a rich black velvety patch in the apical angle. The hindwings are fuscous grey.

The larvae feed on Eucalyptus eugenioides and Eucalyptus gummifera.

References

Xylorycta
Moths described in 1894